The School for Widows is a 1789 comedy play by the British writer Richard Cumberland.

The original Covent Garden cast included William Thomas Lewis as Jack Marmoset, Thomas Ryder as Mr Wordly, John Quick as Sir Wilful Wayward, Alexander Pope as Frederick, Isabella Mattocks as Mrs Wordly, Sarah Wewitzer as Mrs Gayless and Frances Abington as Lady Charlotte Richmore.

References

Bibliography
 Nicoll, Allardyce. A History of English Drama 1660–1900: Volume III. Cambridge University Press, 2009.
 Hogan, C.B (ed.) The London Stage, 1660–1800: Volume V. Southern Illinois University Press, 1968.

1789 plays
Comedy plays
West End plays
Plays by Richard Cumberland